Zebrzydowski's rebellion, or the Sandomierz rebellion, was a rokosz (semi-legal rebellion) in the Polish–Lithuanian Commonwealth against King Sigismund III Vasa. The rokosz, formed on 5 August 1606 by Mikołaj Zebrzydowski, Jan Szczęsny Herburt, Stanisław Stadnicki, Aleksander Józef Lisowski, and Janusz Radziwiłł in Stężyca and Lublin, was caused by the growing dissatisfaction with the King among the nobility (the szlachta). In particular, the rebels disapproved of the King's efforts to limit the power of the nobles, his attempts to weaken the Sejm (the Polish parliament), and to introduce a hereditary monarchy in place of the elective one. The rebellion (1606–1609) ended in the defeat of the rebels. The rebellion led to the szlachta controlling the monarchy in the Polish–Lithuanian political system.

The Rebellion was sparked by several grievances, including the king's attempts to reduce the power of the magnates and increase the power of the royal court. The rebellion was supported by both Protestant and Catholic magnates, and although religious tensions were a factor, the rebels' grievances were broader and reflected more general concerns about the country's direction. The rebels initially achieved some successes with unconventional tactics but were ultimately defeated in a series of battles in early 1607, which had significant repercussions for the Polish-Lithuanian Commonwealth, further weakening an already unstable political system and contributing to a decline in the power and prestige of the king.

History 
The Polish nobles gathered at the rokosz formed a konfederacja and outlined their demands in 67 articles. They demanded Sigismund III's dethronement for breaching the Henrician Articles, and the expulsion of the Jesuits from the Polish–Lithuanian Commonwealth. They further demanded that the Sejm appoint state officials instead of the king; that local officials should be elected and not appointed and that Protestant's rights should be expanded and protected.

The 1607 Sejm rejected the demands. Meanwhile, the rebel nobles gathered in Guzów. In 1607 the Royal Army, led by Hetman Jan Karol Chodkiewicz, was sent to pacify the rebels. A full scale battle ensued on July 5/July 6 (sources vary), with 200 casualties, which resulted in the victory of the Royalist forces.

By 1609, the rebellion was over. Two years after the start of the revolt, the rebellious nobles formally surrendered to the king at the 1609 meeting of the Sejm, which became known as the Pacification Sejm. In return for their surrender the rebels were granted leniency. Many royal supporters, including Hetman Chodkiewicz, had successfully argued for amnesty for the rebels.

Despite the failure of the rebellion, it nevertheless ruined any chance that Sigismund III had to strengthen his role in the government. Polish historian Oskar Halecki wrote:
"The first rebellion in Polish history had sinister consequences. Royalty lost, to great extent, the moral prestige it had enjoyed... The Polish constitution was henceforth regarded as sacrosanct and the king had to renounce not only the idea of making any far-reaching changes in it, but even any reform."

After the rebellion, King Sigismund attempted to funnel the nobles' restless energy into external wars. This, combined with other factors, led to the official Commonwealth involvement in the Polish-Muscovite War (1609–18), which followed the Dimitriads (1605–09).

See also 
 Lubomirski's Rokosz
 Chicken War
 Nihil novi

References

Further reading 
 Kate Wilson, The jewel of liberty stolen?: The Rokosz of Sandomierz and Polish Dissent, paper at Graduate Conference in Central European Studies, The Contours of Legitimacy in Central Europe, Oxford, PDF

1600s conflicts
17th-century rebellions
1600s in the Polish–Lithuanian Commonwealth
Rebellions in the Polish–Lithuanian Commonwealth